Deborah Jiahui Tsai (born 18 December 1994) is an Australian synchronised swimmer. She competed in the team event at the 2016 Summer Olympics. Tsai attended All Saints' College, Perth.

References

External links
 

1994 births
Living people
Australian synchronised swimmers
Olympic synchronised swimmers of Australia
Synchronized swimmers at the 2016 Summer Olympics
People educated at All Saints' College, Perth
Singaporean emigrants to Australia
Sportspeople from Perth, Western Australia
Sportswomen from Western Australia